Arnaud Clément and Nicolas Escudé were the defending champions but only Escudé competed that year with Nenad Zimonjić.

Escudé and Zimonjić lost in the semifinals to Tomáš Cibulec and Pavel Vízner.

Sébastien Grosjean and Fabrice Santoro won in the final 6–1, 6–4 against Tomáš Cibulec and Pavel Vízner.

Seeds

  Jonas Björkman /  Kevin Ullyett (quarterfinals)
  Mahesh Bhupathi /  Joshua Eagle (first round)
  Yevgeny Kafelnikov /  Jared Palmer (first round)
  Martin Damm /  Petr Luxa (quarterfinals)

Draw

External links
Main Draw on ATP Archive

Open 13
2003 ATP Tour